Scarborough Renaissance Festival, more commonly known as Scarborough Faire, is a renaissance fair in Waxahachie, Texas.

Scarborough Faire's first run was in 1981. The festival is open Saturdays and Sundays from the first weekend in April until Memorial Day Monday. The festival is historically based in the 16th century, under the reign of King Henry VIII. There are 21 stages with more than 200 performances. Three jousting shows take place each day. There are about 150 cast members that make up the characters at Scarborough Renaissance Festival. Almost all of the cast members are volunteers.

The Scarborough Renaissance Festival also features 200 shops selling goods such as candles, soaps, jewelry, children's toys and even musical instruments. Many of the craftsmen selling their goods also provide demonstrations on how the items are made. The festival also features the Crown Kitchens - a selection of food stalls serving turkey legs (the festival serves over 20 tons of this signature food item per year), food skewers, sandwiches, ice cream and other items.

2020 saw no festival.

Special programs
Special programs at Scarborough include "Friends of the Faire", an exclusive festival membership with benefits, Student Days, which are special days open only to school groups for educational purposes, and Wedding Packages, which you may purchase to have your own Renaissance-themed wedding in the festival's special Wedding Garden.

Gallery

See also

 Renaissance fair
 List of Renaissance fairs
 Historical reenactment
 Jousting
 Society for Creative Anachronism
 List of open air and living history museums in the United States

Notes

External links

 SRFestival.com Scarborough Renaissance Festival homepage

Recurring events established in 1981
Renaissance fairs
Tourist attractions in Ellis County, Texas
1981 establishments in Texas
Waxahachie, Texas